The 2004 Asian Women's Junior Handball Championship (8th tournament) took place in Bangkok from 1 July–8 July. It acts as the Asian qualifying tournament for the 2005 Women's Junior World Handball Championship.

Results

Final standing

References
www.handball.jp (Archived 2009-09-04)

External links
www.asianhandball.com

International handball competitions hosted by Thailand
Asian Women's Junior Handball Championship, 2004
Asia
Asian Handball Championships